The Course of the Inevitable 2 is the fifth studio album by American rapper Lloyd Banks. It was released on July 15, 2022, through EMPIRE and Bank’s label imprint, Money by Any Means. Production was handled by Cartune Beatz, who produced the majority of the album, as well as Chris Noxx, Cryptic One, Doe Pesci, Fruition Beats, Mr. Authentic and Tha Jerm. The albums features guest appearances from fellow American rappers Benny the Butcher, Conway the Machine, Dave East, Jadakiss, Tony Yayo and Vado.

Background

On April 29, 2022, Lloyd Banks announced he was working on the sequel to his previous album The Course of the Inevitable. He also announced that the album would be released during summer 2022.

On July 8, 2022, he revealed the tracklist of the album and announced that the album would be released on July 15, 2022.

Track listing

 Credits adapted from Tidal.

Charts

References

2022 albums
Lloyd Banks albums
Sequel albums